The year 1570 in science and technology included a number of events, some of which are listed here.

Astronomy
 February 15 – Venus occults Jupiter.

Cartography
 May 20 – Abraham Ortelius publishes Theatrum Orbis Terrarum, the first modern atlas, in Antwerp.
 Jean Cossin publishes a map of the world using sinusoidal projection in Dieppe.

Earth sciences
 February 8 – Concepción earthquake (magnitude 8.3) in Chile.
 Volcanic eruption in the Santorini caldera begins.

Mathematics
 London haberdasher Henry Billingsley makes the first translation of Euclid's Elements into English (from the Greek), The elements of geometrie of the most ancient philosopher Euclide..., with a preface by John Dee and fold-up diagrams.

Medicine
 January 11: Francisco Hernández de Toledo was commissioned by Philip II of Spain to write a description of all the medicinal plants found in the American colonies.

Technology
 Giovanni Padovani publishes a detailed treatise on the construction of sundials, Opus de compositione et usu multiformium horologiorum solarium, in Venice

Deaths
 November 5 - Jacques Grévin French physician and playwright (born c. 1539).

References

 
16th century in science
1570s in science